The 1984–85 Polska Liga Hokejowa season was the 50th season of the Polska Liga Hokejowa, the top level of ice hockey in Poland. 10 teams participated in the league, and Zaglebie Sosnowiec won the championship.

Final round

Qualification round

Playoffs

Quarterfinals 
 Zagłębie Sosnowiec - Stoczniowiec Gdansk 2:0 (6:3, 5:3)
 Naprzód Janów - KS Cracovia 2:0 (3:0, 6:0)
 Polonia Bytom - ŁKS Łódź 2:0 (7:1, 3:2 n.P.)
 Podhale Nowy Targ - GKS Tychy 2:0 (8:1, 2:1)

Semifinals 
 Zagłębie Sosnowiec - Naprzód Janów 2:0 (9:8, 6:5)
 Polonia Bytom - Podhale Nowy Targ 2:1 (4:2, 3:4, 3:2)

Final
 Zagłębie Sosnowiec - Polonia Bytom 2:0 (6:1, 5:3)

Placing round

7th place 
 ŁKS Łódź - Stoczniowiec Gdansk 1:2 (4:2, 4:8, 7:9)

5th place 
 KS Cracovia - GKS Tychy 1:2 (7:4, 5:8, 4:7)

3rd place 
 Podhale Nowy Targ - Naprzód Janów 2:0 (5:2, 6:2)

Relegation
 GKS Katowice - Unia Oświęcim 2:0 (6:0, 9:2)

External links
 Season on hockeyarchives.info

Polska
Polska Hokej Liga seasons
Liga